David Arends Gieseker (born 23 November 1943 in Oakland, California) is an American mathematician, specializing in algebraic geometry.

Gieseker received his bachelor's degree in 1965 from Reed College and his master's degree from Harvard University in 1967. In 1970 he received his Ph.D. under Robin Hartshorne with thesis Contributions to the Theory of Positive Embeddings in Algebraic Geometry. Gieseker became a professor at the University of California, Los Angeles in 1975 and became professor emeritus in 2022.

The topics of his research include geometric invariant theory and moduli of vector bundles over algebraic curves.

Selected publications

Articles
with Spencer Bloch: 

with Jun Li: 
with Jun Li:

Books
Lectures on moduli of curves, Tata Institute of Fundamental Research, Springer Verlag 1982; notes by D. R. Gokhale
with Eugene Trubowitz and Horst Knörrer: Geometry of algebraic Fermi curves, Academic Press 1992

References

External links
New Developments in Stability and Moduli, Conference in Honor of the 68th Birthday of David Gieseker, July 18–23, 2011, Hang-Zhou and Li Jiang, China

1943 births
Living people
20th-century American mathematicians
21st-century American mathematicians
Reed College alumni
Harvard University alumni
University of California, Los Angeles faculty